Charaxes paradoxa is a butterfly in the family Nymphalidae. It is found on Grande Comore. The habitat consists of forests.

The larvae feed on Phyllanthus species.

Taxonomy
Charaxes paradoxa is a member of the species group Charaxes etesipe.

The clade members are:
Charaxes etesipe, nominate
Charaxes penricei 
Charaxes achaemenes 
Charaxes paradoxa
Charaxes cacuthis
Charaxes bwete
Charaxes cristalensis

References

External links
Charaxes paradoxa images at Consortium for the Barcode of Life

Butterflies described in 1925
paphianus
Endemic fauna of the Comoros